Stilbenoids are hydroxylated derivatives of stilbene. They have a C6–C2–C6 structure. In biochemical terms, they belong to the family of phenylpropanoids and share most of their biosynthesis pathway with chalcones. Most stilbenoids are produced by plants, and the only known exception is the antihelminthic and antimicrobial stilbenoid, 2-isopropyl-5-[(E)-2-phenylvinyl]benzene-1,3-diol, biosynthesized by the Gram-negative bacterium Photorhabdus luminescens.

Chemistry 
Stilbenoids are hydroxylated derivatives of stilbene and have a C6–C2–C6 structure. They belong to the family of phenylpropanoids and share most of their biosynthesis pathway with chalcones. Under UV irradiation, stilbene and its derivatives undergo intramolecular cyclization, called stilbene photocyclization to form dihydrophenanthrenes. Oligomeric forms are known as oligostilbenoids.

Types 
Aglycones
 Piceatannol in the roots of Norway spruces 
 Pinosylvin is a fungal toxin protecting wood from fungal infection, found in trees of the pine family
 Pterostilbene in almonds, pine and vaccinium berries
 Resveratrol in grapes

Glycosides
 Astringin in the bark of Norway spruce
 Piceid is a resveratrol derivative in grape juices

Production 
Stilbenoids are produced in various plants, for example they are secondary products of heartwood formation in trees that can act as phytoalexins. Another example is resveratrol, an antifungal which is found in grapes and which has been suggested to have health benefits. Ampelopsin A and Ampelopsin B are resveratrol dimers produced in porcelain berry.
 
A bacterial stilbenoid, (E)-3,5-dihydroxy-4-isopropyl-trans-stilbene, is produced by Photorhabdus which is a bacterial symbiont of insect nematodes called Heterorhabditis.

Stilbenoids are secondary metabolites present in Cannabis sativa.

Properties 
Phytoalexins have been suggested by some studies to be responsible for resistance to some tree diseases, such as pine wilt.

See also 
 Combretastatins, many are stilbenoids
 Dihydrostilbenoids, no double bond on the bridge
 List of antioxidants in food
 List of phytochemicals in food
 Phytochemistry
 Secondary metabolites
 Stilbestrol

References

Books